The Dutch ship HNLMS Java launched in 1885 at Rotterdam was a sloop or small unprotected cruiser.

The ship was named after the island of Java in the Dutch East Indies (now Indonesia).  This ship was a small colonial warship, larger than most gunboats but weaker than a protected cruiser.  The term sloop in the steamship era was used by some navies including the British Navy for what were essentially large gunboats.  The Java resembled the Spanish unprotected cruisers of the Velasco class, which were used for colonial duties (and the unsuccessful defense of Manila Bay in 1898).

Four of her crew got aboard Loch Broom. HNLMS Java was on a voyage from Rotterdam, South Holland to Java, Netherlands East Indies. She put in to Plymouth, Devon, United Kingdom.

References

Bibliography

 

1885 ships
19th-century naval ships of the Netherlands
Ships built in Rotterdam
Maritime incidents in March 1886